In the Russian Federation, lesbian, gay, bisexual, and transgender (LGBT) people face legal and social challenges not experienced by others. Although sexual activity between same-sex couples is legal, homosexuality is disapproved of by most of the population, and same-sex couples and households headed by same-sex couples are ineligible for the legal protections available to opposite-sex couples. Russia provides no anti-discrimination protections for LGBT people and does not have a designation for hate crimes based on sexual orientation and gender identity. Transgender people are allowed to change their legal gender without requiring sex reassignment surgery; however, there are currently no laws prohibiting discrimination based on gender identity or expression, and recent laws could discriminate against transgender residents.

Russia has long held strongly negative views regarding homosexuality, with recent polls indicating that a majority of Russians are against the acceptance of homosexuality and have shown support for laws discriminating against homosexuals. Despite receiving international criticism for the recent increase in social discrimination, crimes, and violence against homosexuals, larger cities such as Moscow and Saint Petersburg have been said to have a thriving LGBT community. However, there has been a historic resistance to gay pride parades by local governments; despite being fined by the European Court of Human Rights in 2010 for interpreting it as discrimination, the city of Moscow denied 100 individual requests for permission to hold Moscow Pride through 2012, citing a risk of violence against participants.

In December 1917, after the October Revolution, the Russian Soviet Republic (later the Russian SFSR) decriminalised homosexuality. However, in 1933, the Soviet Union under Joseph Stalin recriminalised sex between men. Article 121 was added to the criminal code on 7 March 1934 for the entire Soviet Union that expressly prohibited male homosexuality, with up to five years of hard labour in prison. During the Soviet regime, Western observers believed that between 800 and 1,000 men were imprisoned each year under Article 121. After the dissolution of the Soviet Union, homosexuality acts between consenting males were re-legalised in 1993, removing Article 121 from the RSFSR penal code.

Since 2006, under Vladimir Putin, regions in Russia have enacted varying laws restricting the distribution of materials promoting LGBT relationships to minors; in June 2013, a federal law criminalizing the distribution of materials among minors in support of non-traditional sexual relationships was enacted as an amendment to an existing child protection law. The law has resulted in the numerous arrests of Russian LGBT citizens publicly opposing the law and there has reportedly been a surge of anti-gay protests, violence, and even hate crimes. It has received international criticism from human rights observers, LGBT activists, and media outlets and has been viewed as a de facto means of criminalizing LGBT culture. The law was ruled to be inconsistent with protection of freedom of expression by the European Court of Human Rights but as of 2021 has not been repealed. In 2022, the law was extended to apply to anyone regardless of age, thus making any expression deemed a promotion of non-traditional sexual relationships illegal.

In a report issued on 13 April 2017, a panel of five expert advisors to the United Nations Human Rights Council—Vitit Muntarbhorn, Sètondji Roland Adjovi; Agnès Callamard; Nils Melzer; and David Kaye—condemned the wave of torture and killings of gay men in Chechnya.

History 

Homosexuality has been documented in Russia for centuries. Medieval Russia was apparently very tolerant of homosexuality, with foreign visitors to the country surprised by displays of affection between homosexuals. The earliest documented bans on homosexuality date to the early-mid 17th century, during the reign of Tsar Alexis Mikhailovich, who began the process of the Europeanization and modernization of Russia. Under the reign of Peter the Great in the 18th, who introduced a wide range of reforma aimed at modernizing and Westernizing Russia, the were a ban on male homosexual activity, but only in military statutes for soldiers. In 1832, the criminal code included Article 995, which stated that "muzhelozhstvo", or men lying with men, was a criminal act punishable by exile to Siberia for up to 5 years. Men lying with men was interpreted by courts as meaning anal sex. Application of the laws was rare, and the turn of the century found a relaxation of these laws and a general growing of tolerance and visibility.

In the wake of the October Revolution, the Bolshevik regime decriminalized homosexuality. The Bolsheviks rewrote the constitution and "produced two Criminal Codes – in 1922 and 1926 – and an article prohibiting homosexual sex was left off both." The new Communist Party government removed the old laws regarding sexual relations, effectively legalising homosexual and transgender activity within Russia, although it remained illegal in other territories of the Soviet Union, and the homosexuals in Russia were still persecuted and sacked from their jobs. Under Joseph Stalin, the Soviet Union recriminalized homosexuality in a decree signed in 1933. The new Article 121, which punished "muzhelozhstvo" with imprisonment for up to 5 years, saw raids and arrests. Female homosexuals were sent to mental institutions. The decree was part of a broader campaign against "deviant" behavior and "Western degeneracy". Following Stalin's death, there was a liberalisation of attitudes toward sexual issues in the Soviet Union, but homosexual acts remained illegal. Discrimination against LGBT individuals persisted in the Soviet era, and homosexuality was not officially declassified as a mental illness until 1999.

Soviet Article 121 was often commonly used to extend prison sentences and to control dissidents. Among those imprisoned were the well-known film director Sergei Paradjanov and the poet Gennady Trifonov. Under Mikhail Gorbachev's administration in the late 1980s, the first gay organization came into being. The Moscow Gay & Lesbian Alliance was headed by Yevgeniya Debryanskaya and Roman Kalinin, who became the editor of the first officially registered gay newspaper, Tema. The fall of the USSR accelerated the progress of the gay movement in Russia. Gay publications and plays appeared. In 1993, a new Russian Criminal Code was signed, without Article 121. Men who had been imprisoned began to be released.

Current situation 
 The age of consent currently stands at 16 since 2003, regardless of sexual orientation.
Transgender people can change their legal gender after corresponding medical procedures since 1997.
 Homosexuality was officially removed from the Russian list of mental illnesses in 1999 (after the endorsement of the World Health Organization's ICD-10 classifications). 
 As far as adoptions of children: Single persons living within Russia, regardless of their sexual orientation, can adopt children. Russian children can be adopted by a single homosexual who lives in a foreign country provided that country does not recognize same-sex marriage. A couple can adopt children together, as a couple, only if they are a married heterosexual couple.

 The Russian constitution guarantees the right of peaceful association. Nevertheless, organs of authority in Russia refuse to register LGBT organizations.

Public opinion
Public opinion in Russia tends to be hostile toward homosexuality and the level of intolerance has been rising. A 2013 survey found that 74% of Russians said homosexuality should not be accepted by society (up from 60% in 2002), compared to 16% who said that homosexuality should be accepted by society. In a 2015 survey of  2,471 Russians, 86% said homosexuality should not be accepted by society. In a 2007 survey, 68% of Russians said homosexuality is always wrong (54%) or almost always wrong (14%). In a 2005 poll, 44% of Russians were in favour of making homosexual acts between consenting adults a criminal act; at the same time, 43% of Russians supported a legal ban on discrimination on the basis of sexual orientation. In 2013, 16% of Russians surveyed said that gay people should be isolated from society, 22% said they should be forced to undergo treatment, and 5% said homosexuals should be "liquidated". In Russian psychiatry, Soviet mentality about homosexuality has endured into the present day. For instance, in spite of the removal of homosexuality from the nomenclature of mental disorders, 62.5% of 450 surveyed psychiatrists in the Rostov Region view it as an illness, and up to three-quarters view it as immoral behavior. The psychiatrists sustain the objections to pride parades and the use of veiled schemes to lay off openly lesbian and gay persons from schools, child care centres, and other public institutions. A Russian motorcycle club called the Night Wolves, which is closely associated with Russian President Vladimir Putin and which suggests "Death to faggots" as an alternate name for itself, organized a large Anti-Maidan rally in February 2015 at which a popular slogan was "We don't need Western ideology and gay parades!"

Same-sex unions

Neither same-sex marriages nor civil unions of same-sex couples are allowed in Russia. In July 2013, Patriarch Kirill, the leader of the Russian Orthodox Church, of which approximately 71% of Russians are adherents, said that the idea of same-sex marriage was "a very dangerous sign of the Apocalypse". At a 2011 press conference, the head of the Moscow Registry Office, Irina Muravyova, declared: "Attempts by same-sex couples to marry both in Moscow and elsewhere in Russia are doomed to fail. We live in a civil society, we are guided by the federal law, [and] by the Constitution that clearly says: marriage in Russia is between a man and a woman. Such a marriage [same-sex] cannot be contracted in Russia." The vast majority of the Russian public are also against same-sex marriage. In July 2020, Russian voters approved a Constitution amendment banning same-sex marriage. In the 2021 case Fedotova and Others v. Russia, the European Court of Human Rights ruled that it was a violation of human rights for Russia not to offer any form of legal recognition to same-sex relationships.

Military service
Before 1993, homosexual acts between consenting males were against the law in Russia, and homosexuality was considered a mental disorder until adoption of ICD-10 in 1999, but even after that military medical expertise statute was in force to continue considering homosexuality a mental disorder which was a reason to deny homosexuals to serve in the military. On 1 July 2003, a new military medical expertise statute was adopted; it said people "who have problems with their identity and sexual preferences" can only be drafted during war times. However, this clause contradicted another clause of the same statute which stated that different sexual orientation should not be considered a deviation. This ambiguity was resolved by the Major-General of the Medical Service Valery Kulikov who clearly stated that the new medical statute "does not forbid people of non-standard sexual orientation from serving in the military." However, he added that people of non-standard sexual orientation should not reveal their sexual orientation while serving in the army because "other soldiers are not going to like that; they can be beaten". President Vladimir Putin said in a U.S. television interview in 2010 that openly gay men were not excluded from military service in Russia. In 2013, it was reported that the Defense Ministry had issued a guideline on assessment of new recruits' mental health that recommends recruits be asked about their sexual history and be examined for certain types of tattoos, especially genital or buttocks tattoos, that would allegedly indicate a homosexual orientation.

Gay pride events

There have been notable objections to the organization of gay pride parades in several Russian cities, most prominently Moscow, where authorities have never approved a request to hold a gay pride rally. Former Moscow mayor Yuri Luzhkov supported the city's refusal to authorize the first two editions of Nikolay Alexeyev's Moscow Pride events, calling them as "satanic". The events still went on as planned, in defiance of their lack of authorization. In 2010, Russia was fined by the European Court of Human Rights, ruling that, as alleged by Alexeyev, Russian cities were discriminating against the gay community by refusing to authorize pride parades. Although authorities had claimed allowing pride events to be held would pose a risk of violence, the Court ruled that their decisions "effectively approved of and supported groups who had called for [their] disruption." In August 2012, contravening the previous ruling, the Moscow City Court upheld a ruling blocking requests by the organizers of Moscow Pride for authorization to hold the parade yearly through 2112, citing the possibility of public disorder and a lack of support for such events by residents of Moscow.

Chechnya

Anti-gay purges in the Chechen Republic have included forced disappearances — secret abductions, imprisonment, and torture — by authorities targeting persons based on their perceived sexual orientation. An unknown number of men, who authorities detained on suspicion of being gay or bisexual, have reportedly died after being held in what human rights groups and eyewitnesses have called concentration camps.

Allegations were initially reported on 1 April 2017 in Novaya Gazeta, a Russian-language opposition newspaper, which reported that since February 2017 over 100 men had allegedly been detained and tortured and at least three had died in an extrajudicial killing. The paper, citing its sources in the Chechen special services, called the wave of detentions a "prophylactic sweep". The journalist who first reported on the subject went into hiding. There have been calls for reprisals against journalists who report on the situation.

As news spread of Chechen authorities' actions, which have been described as part of a systematic anti-LGBT purge, Russian and international activists scrambled to evacuate survivors of the camps and other vulnerable Chechens but were met with difficulty obtaining visas to conduct them safely beyond Russia.

The reports of the persecution were met with a variety of reactions worldwide. The Head of the Chechen Republic Ramzan Kadyrov denied not only the occurrence of any persecution but also the existence of gay men in Chechnya, adding that such people would be killed by their own families. Officials in Moscow were sceptical, although in late May the Russian government reportedly agreed to send an investigative team to Chechnya. Numerous national leaders and other public figures in the West condemned Chechnya's actions, and protests were held in Russia and elsewhere. A report released in December 2018 by the Organization for Security and Cooperation in Europe (OSCE) confirmed claims that persecution of LGBT persons had taken place and was ignored by authorities.

On 11 January 2019, it was reported that another 'gay purge' had begun in the country in December 2018, with several gay men and women being detained. The Russian LGBT Network believes that around 40 persons were detained and two killed.

In March 2021, Reuters reported that the European Union imposed economic sanctions on two Chechen officials accused of persecuting LGBT people in Chechnya.

Public opinion 

Russia has traditionally been socially conservative on LGBT rights, with 2013 polls indicating a large majority of Russians oppose legal recognition of same-sex marriage, and support for laws restricting the distribution of "propaganda" that promotes non-traditional sexual relationships.

In 2019, a survey showed that 47% of Russian respondents agreed that "gays and lesbians should enjoy the same rights as other citizens," while 43 percent disagreed, a rise from 39% in 2013. This marks the highest level of support in 14 years.

In 2019, a poll showed that only 2% would show interest and a willingness to communicate if the neighbour was a homosexual couple or a member of a religious sect, the last of the category of people presented.

According to a 2019 poll carried out by the Russian Public Opinion Foundation (FOM), 7% of Russians agreed that same-sex marriages should be allowed in Russia, while 87% opposed the idea.

Employment discrimination 

Anton Krasovsky, a television news anchor at government-run KontrTV, was immediately fired from his job in January 2013 when he announced during a live broadcast that he is gay and disgusted by the national anti-gay propaganda legislation that had been proposed although had not yet passed.

In September 2013, a Khabarovsk teacher and gay rights activist, Alexander Yermoshkin, was fired from his two jobs as school teacher and university researcher. A week earlier, he had been attacked by members of a local neo-Nazi group "Shtolz Khabarovsk". An activist group called "Movement against the propaganda of sexual perversions" had campaigned for his dismissal.

Viewpoints of political parties 
The federal law banning LGBT propaganda among minors was passed unanimously by the Russian Duma; as the bill amended an existing child protection law, it is difficult to know whether or not all of the MPs, and their respective political parties, supported every aspect of the bill or not. A few political parties without members in the Duma have expressed some limited support for LGBT rights.

Yabloko is a member of the Liberal International, and has organized public demonstrations against intolerance under the banner of building a "Russia without pogroms".

The Libertarian Party of Russia, formed in 2007, has objected to the government ban on "gay propaganda" as a violation of people's right to freedom of speech.

In 2016, two openly gay men ran for seats in the Russian duma. While they admit that they probably will not win a seat, they were supported by a liberal coalition. They are also probably the first openly gay candidates to run for seats in the Russian parliament.

The LGBT rights organisation Gayrussia.ru has been monitoring homophobic political parties since 2011. In the middle of 2013 their list included: United Russia, Communist Party of Russian Federation, Narodnaya Volya, National Bolshevik Party, National Bolshevik Front, Patriots of Russia, Eurasian Youth Union and Fair Russia.

President Vladimir Putin has used the existence of transgender rights in other countries as justification for the potential deployment of nuclear weapons against Ukraine. In a speech given on September 30, 2022, Putin said "Do we want things that lead to degradation and extinction to be imposed on children from elementary school? Do we want them to be taught that instead of men and women, there are supposedly some other genders and to be offered sex-change surgeries? This is unacceptable to us.” before following up by stating that Russia would be willing to use “all means at our disposal” against Ukraine, and saying that the United States “created a precedent” when it used nuclear weapons against Japan in 1945, mirroring comments by other Russian officials that nuclear weapons were on the table.

Hate crimes 

On 20 January 2013, six demonstrating LGBT activists in the provincial capital of Voronezh were attacked by over 500 people. The protest by these agitators, who appeared with Hitler salutes and hate slogans and threw snowballs, bottles and other objects at the demonstrators and then beat them up, was not registered. The police assigned 10 officers to this event. The employees of the nearby Adidas sports shop staged its mannequins with Hitler salutes in solidarity with the beating. At least three LGBT activists, including women, were injured and hospitalized during the resistance. On the same day, the author of the Petersburg law against 'homosexual propaganda', Vitaly Milonov, posted on his Twitter that "Voronezh is great".

Unlike in many western nations, LGBT persons in Russia are not protected by specific legal protections. Violent criminal acts carried out against these persons are prosecuted as criminal offences under Russian law, but the fact that these crimes are motivated by the sexual orientation or gender identity of the victim is not considered an aggravating factor when the court determines the sentence. Among the more vicious crimes that would qualify as hate crimes outside of Russia and are reported in the press would include the following;
 On 9 May 2013, after Victory Day parades in Volgograd, the body of a 23-year-old man was found tortured and murdered by three males who stated anti-homosexual motivations, even though family and friends state the victim had no behavior inclination.
 On 29 May 2013, the body of 38-year-old deputy director of Kamchatka airport Oleg Serdyuk (rus: Олег Сердюк) was found in his burned-out car, having been beaten and stabbed the previous day. Local authorities said the murder was motivated by homophobia. Three suspects (who were local residents) were tried and sentenced to prison terms of 9 to 12 years.
 From October 2013 – February 2014, anti-gay attacks targeting the LGBT community in Moscow were reported at Russia's largest gay nightclub Central Station, including gunfire and gas attacks. Several attacks and victim responses were documented in an ABC News Nightline special "Moscow is Burning". Several employees subsequently left the country.

Transgender issues 
In Tsarist Russia, young women would sometimes pose as men or act like tomboys. This was often tolerated among the educated middle classes, with the assumption that such behavior was asexual and would stop when the girl married. However, cross-dressing was widely seen as sexually immoral behavior, punishable by God promoted through the Church and later criminalized by the government.

In Soviet Russia, sex reassignment surgeries were first tried during the 1920s but became prohibited until the 1960s. Later they were performed by Irina Golubeva, an endocrinologist, authorized by psychiatrist Aron Belkin, who was the strongest Soviet advocate for transgender people until his death in 2003.

On 29 December 2014, Russia passed a road safety law, allowing the government to deny driver's licenses to people with several classes of mental disorders according to ICD-10. Class "F60-69 Disorders of adult personality and behaviour" includes "F64 Transsexualism" Russian and foreign critics perceived the law as a ban on transgender drivers: journalist Yelena Masyuk questioned the relevance of a person's transgender identity in regards to their ability to drive. On 14 January 2015, Russia's Health Ministry clarified the law, stating that it would only deny licenses to those with disorders that would impair their ability to drive safely, and explicitly stated that one's sexual orientation would not be considered a factor under the law, as it is not considered a psychiatric disorder.

In 2018, the Ministry of Health of the Russian Federation developed a draft medical certificate that will help transgender people with confirming their gender identity on their legal documents. The Ministry of Justice approved this document on January 19, 2018. Up to this point, changes related to the gender change could only be made to the documents on the basis of a court decision. The Ministry of Health explained that, in accordance with the legislation, the registry offices make changes to the birth certificate if a mentioned certificate is submitted.

A certificate of gender change required to change person's gender in documents such as a birth certificate and passport, and can be obtained on the basis of a medical commission consisting of a psychiatrist, a sexologist and a medical psychologist. Neither sex-affirmative surgery nor hormone replacement therapy required. The minimum duration of psychiatric observation is not specified in the final document of the Ministry of Health.
On average, the commission lasts from 2 days to 1 month.

Propaganda bans

Regional laws 

Between 2006 and 2013, ten regions enacted a ban on "propaganda of homosexualism" among minors. The laws of nine of them prescribe punishments of administrative sanctions and/or fines. The laws in some of the regions also forbid so-called "propaganda of bisexualism and transgenderism" to minors. As of May 2013 the regions that had enacted these various laws, and the years in which they had passed the laws, included: Ryazan Oblast (2006), Arkhangelsk Oblast (2011), Saint Petersburg (2012), Kostroma Oblast (2012), Magadan Oblast (2012), Novosibirsk Oblast (2012), Krasnodar Krai (2012), Samara Oblast (2012), Bashkortostan (2012), and Kaliningrad Oblast (February 2013). Then, Arkhangelsk (2013) and Saint Petersburg (2014) removed the law.

In 2019, Russia cut and censored gay sex scenes in the movie musical Rocketman based on the life of British singer Elton John, a decision he criticized, saying it is "cruelly unaccepting of the love between two people."

National laws 

Federal laws passed on 29 June 2013 ban the distribution of "propaganda of non-traditional sexual relationships" among minors. Critics contend the law makes illegal holding any sort of public demonstration in favour of gay rights, speak in defence of LGBT rights, and distribute material related to LGBT culture, or to state that same-sex relationships are equal to heterosexual relationships. Additionally the laws have received international condemnation from human rights campaigners, and media outlets that even display of LGBT symbols, such as the rainbow flag, have resulted in arrests, and incited homophobic violence. 

The law subjects Russian citizens found guilty to fines of up to 5,000 roubles and public officials to fines of up to 50,000 roubles. Organizations or businesses will be fined up to 1 million roubles and be forced to cease operations for up to 90 days. Foreigners may be arrested and detained for up to 15 days then deported, as well as fined up to 100,000 roubles. Russian citizens who have used the Internet or media to promote "non-traditional relations" will be fined up to 100,000 roubles.

The statute amended a law that is said to protect children from pornography and other "harmful information". One of the authors of the statute, Yelena Mizulina, who is the chair of the Duma's Committee on Family, Women, and Children and who has been described by some as a moral crusader, told lawmakers as the bill was being considered, "Traditional sexual relations are relations between a man and a woman.... These relations need special protection". Mizulina argued that a recent poll had shown 88% of the public were in support of the bill.

Commenting on the bill prior to its passage, President Putin said, during a visit to Amsterdam in April 2013, "I want everyone to understand that in Russia there are no infringements on sexual minorities' rights. They're people, just like everyone else, and they enjoy full rights and freedoms". He went on to say that he fully intended to sign the bill because the Russian people demanded it. As he put it, "Can you imagine an organization promoting pedophilia in Russia? I think people in many Russian regions would have started to take up arms.... The same is true for sexual minorities: I can hardly imagine same-sex marriages being allowed in Chechnya. Can you imagine it? It would have resulted in human casualties." Putin also mentioned that he was concerned about Russia's low birth-rate and that same-sex relationships do not produce children.

Critics say that the statute is written so broadly that it is in effect a complete ban on the gay rights movement and any public expression of LGBT culture.

In July 2013, four Dutch tourists were arrested for allegedly discussing gay rights with Russian youths. The four were arrested for allegedly spreading "propaganda of nontraditional relationships among the under-aged" after talking to teens at a camp in the northern city of Murmansk.

In March 2018 the Russian authorities forbade the biggest gay website Gay.ru because of "propaganda of nontraditional sexual relationships".

In December 2022, an amendment to the propaganda law was signed into law by Putin, extending it to all age groups. It also prohibits the distribution of materials that promote "pedophilia", or give minors a "desire to change their sex".

In February 2023, the Russian government introduced the AI program Oculus to scan to internet for illegal content, including “LGBT propaganda”.

Domestic reactions 

According to a survey conducted in June 2013 by the Russian Public Opinion Research Center (VTsIOM), at least 90% of those surveyed were in favor of the law.

Russian historian and human rights activist Lyudmila Alexeyeva has called it "a step toward the Middle Ages".

In January 2016, the State Duma rejected a proposal by the Communist Party to punish people who publicly express their homosexuality with fines and arrests.

International reactions and boycott 

International human rights organisations and the governments of developed democracies around the world have strongly condemned this Russian law. The Office of the United Nations High Commissioner for Human Rights has condemned this Russian statute and another similar one in Moldova (which was later repealed) as discriminatory and has made clear that the Russian statute in question is a violation of international human rights law, including the right of gay children to receive proper information. The European Parliament has condemned Russia for homophobic discrimination and censorship and the Council of Europe has called on Russia to protect LGBT rights properly. The European Court of Human Rights had previously fined Russia for other infringements of LGBT rights. In 2012 the UN Human Rights Committee ruled that a similar statute in the Russia's Ryazan Region was discriminatory, infringed on freedom of expression, and was inadmissible under international law – a Russian court in Ryazan later agreed and struck it down. Some members of the gay community commenced a boycott of Russian goods, particularly Russian vodka.

Many Western celebrities and activists are openly opposed to the law and have encouraged a boycott of Russian products – notably Russian vodka – as well as a boycott of the 2014 Winter Olympic Games, which were scheduled to be held in Sochi, unless the Games were relocated out of Russia.

Political figures 
United States President Barack Obama said that while he did not favour boycotting the Sochi Olympics over the law, "Nobody's more offended than me about some of the anti-gay and lesbian legislation that you've been seeing in Russia". Obama subsequently, in September 2013, met with Russian gay rights activists during a visit to St. Petersburg to attend a meeting of the G-20 nations' leaders. Obama said that he was proud of the work the activists were doing. His aides had said that Obama's opposition to the anti-gay propaganda law was one reason Obama had canceled a meeting previously planned to have been held with Russian President Putin during the trip.

The law was also condemned by German Chancellor Angela Merkel and German cabinet secretaries, British Prime Minister David Cameron, Australian Foreign Minister Bob Carr, as well as Canadian Prime Minister Stephen Harper and Foreign Affairs Minister John Baird.

Summary table

See also 

 Human rights in Russia
 LGBT rights in Asia
 LGBT rights in Europe
 LGBT culture in Russia
 LGBT history in Russia
 LGBT rights in Chechnya
 LGBT Human Rights Project Gayrussia.ru
 Moscow Helsinki Watch Group
 Nikolay Alexeyev
 Recognition of same-sex unions in Russia
 Think of the children
 Vitaly Milonov
 Russian LGBT Network

Notes

References

Sources

Further reading 

 
 Clark, F. (2014). "Discrimination against LGBT people triggers health concerns." Lancet, 383(9916), 500–502.

External links 

 LGBT Human Rights Project GayRussia.Ru (en)(ru)
 Russian National Gay, Lesbian, Bisexual, Transsexual Website (ru)
 Is HOMO what OMON sees in the mirror? – The eXile (en)
 LGBT History: Russia (en)
 State Duma rejected "sexual hatred" to be the reason for criminal prosecution 14 February 2004 (en)
 Bashkortostan Parliament's deputy proposes legitimating homosexual marriages 22 May 2004 (en)
Gay and lesbian parents afraid to send kids to school in Russia, Xtra Magazine, 14 June 2014 (en)

 
Law of Russia